The Ngaatjatjarra (otherwise spelt Ngadadjara) are an Indigenous Australian people of Western Australia, with communities located in the north eastern part of the Goldfields-Esperance region.

Name
The ethnonym Ngaatjatjarra, in line with a general practice in their area, combines the interrogative pronoun used by each tribe for "who", "what". In their case this yields up a combination of ŋa:da and the possessive suffix -t(d)jara, is attached. The sense therefore is, "(people) using the form ŋa:da for the idea of 'who/what'".

Language
Ngaatjatjarra is mutually intelligible with Ngaanyatjarra, and both are treated as dialects of the one language.

Country
The centre of their traditional life was in the Warburton Ranges and in particular at a site, Warupuju Spring, where water was always available. Their eastern frontiers lay around Fort Welcome, the Blackstone Ranges, Murray Range and Mount Hinckley. In the southeast, their furthest boundary was at the Ero:tjo watering hole, south of Wangalina. To the northeast, they roamed as far as Kudjuntari in the Schwerin Mural Crescent Range and around Julia (Giles) in the Yurliya Range. Their northern range extended to Hopkins Lake and Carnegie Range and beyond the Christopher Lake. Their western limits were around Tekateka and Jalara and the Alfred Marie Ranges.

Tindale's map places the neighbouring tribes of the Ngaatjatjarra as, running clockwise, the Keiadjara and the Wenamba to their north, the Pitjantjatjara on their eastern frontier, the Nakako and Mandjindja to their south and the Ngaanyatjarra on their western borders. The AIATSIS map calls then Ngatatjara and absorbs the Keiadjara and the Wenamba in to the Martu and Pintupi respectively.

A native map of their water mythology explaining how the overarching rainbow, Tjurtiraŋo, produces the various water resources, was made for Tindale in the 1939s and is reproduced in his 1974 book.

Ngaanyatjara lands 
The "Ngaanyatjara lands" are those administered by the Ngaanyatjarra Council (Aboriginal Corporation), which includes the communities of
Irrunytju (Wingelinna), Kiwirrkurra, Mantamaru (Jameson), Papulankutja (Blackstone), Patjarr (Karilywara), Kanpa (Pira Kata), Tjirrkarli, Tjukurla, Warakurna, Wanarn, Warburton (Mirlirrtjarra).

Social organization
The practiced patrilocal residence, and their marriage arrangements were based on for class system. Father's father, father, son, son's son and their brothers inherited a totem (tjukur/tuma) which bore associations with specific topographical features of the landscape that evoked the movements of the creative being in their dreaming. They practiced both circumcision and subincision, in two distinct phrases, on youths undergoing initiation into full manhood, employing biface pressure-flaked stone knives ('tjimbila), which they obtained through trade with neighbouring tribes to their north, who in turn ultimately received them from their production centre in northwestern Australia.

Food
The Ngaatjatjarra harvested grass seeds (wakati) and worked them with rolling stones to obtain a paste for nutriment. They also gathered nicotiniana excelsior, a tobacco leaf which they dried over fire and which they chew after mixing them with ashes from burnt acacia and phyllodes.

History of contact
The first white contact with the Ngaatjatjarra came relatively late. Tindale describes in detail one nuclear family of the tribe encountered in August 1935 during the Expedition of the Board for Anthropological Research of the University of Adelaide.

Alternative names

 Jabungadja. ("mountain Ngadja," those of the Rawlinson Ranges)
 Ku.rara. (Pitjantjatjara exonym for Rawlinson Ranges' tribes)
 Nga:da
 Nga:dapitjardi. (western tribal name for hordes in the vicinity of the Blackstone Ranges)
 Ngadatara. (Pitjantjatjara exonym)
 Ngadawongga
 Nganadjara. (Warburton Range horde name for those northeast of them near the Rawlinson Ranges)
 Ngatatjara, Ngadjatara, Ngadadara, Nadadjara, Ngadatjara
 Rumudjara
 Teitudjara. (Nana exonym)
 Wan:udjara. (eastern Ngadadjara name for their northern branches at Giles)
 Warara. (northeastern hordes' name)
 Wirtjandja
 Witjandja. (Warburton Range horde)

Source:

Some words
 tartu (seeds pods of the river red gum used to decorate a girl's hair)
 tjitjimurdilja (uncircumcised youth)
 wana (woman's digging stick)

Notes

Citations

Sources

Aboriginal peoples of Western Australia
Goldfields-Esperance